The Finland national football team represents Finland in men's international football competitions and is controlled by the Football Association of Finland, the governing body for football in Finland, which was founded in 1907. The team has been a member of FIFA since 1908 and a UEFA member since 1957.

Finland had never qualified for a major tournament until securing a spot at UEFA Euro 2020, which was postponed to 2021 due to the COVID-19 pandemic. After many decades of average results and campaigns, the nation made progression in the 2000s, achieving notable results against established European teams and reaching a peak of 33rd in the FIFA World Rankings in 2007. But, after that, they saw a decline of performances and results, drawing them to their all-time low of 110th in the FIFA Rankings in 2017. However, after five years of their all-time low in the FIFA Rankings, as of April 2022, they sit at the 57th place in the overall ranking, and at the 29th place between the European FIFA members. Finland is one of the few countries in Europe where football is not the most popular sport. As a result, their level in football is not as high as in ice hockey, which is much more popular in Finland.

History

Early history
The Football Association of Finland was founded in 1907 and became a member of FIFA in 1908. At the time, Finland was an autonomous grand duchy of the Russian Empire. Finland played its first international on 22 October 1911, as Sweden beat the Finns at the Eläintarha Stadium in Helsinki. Finland participated the 1912 Summer Olympics in Stockholm, beating Italy and the Russian Empire, but losing the bronze medal match against the Netherlands.

Period of dispersion 

After the 1918 Civil War, the Finnish sports movement was divided into the right-wing Finnish Gymnastics and Sports Federation (SVUL) and the leftist Finnish Workers' Sports Federation (TUL), Finnish Football Association was a member of the SVUL. Both sides had their own championship series, and between 1919 and 1939 the Finland national team was selected of the Football Association players only. The Finnish Workers' Sports Federation football team in turn, participated the competitions of the international labour movement.

However, since the late 1920s several top footballers defected from TUL and joined the Football Association to be eligible for the national team. During the 1930s, these ″defectors″ formed the spine of the national team. For example, the Finland squad at the 1936 Summer Olympics was composed of eight former TUL players. In 1937, Finland participated the FIFA World Cup qualification for the first time, losing all three matches against Sweden, Germany and Estonia.

Since 1939, TUL players were selected to the national team and finally in 1956, the TUL and Football Association series were merged.

Post-war years 
The 1952 Summer Olympics in Helsinki saw the Finnish hosts lose to Austria in the first round. Finland did, however, win the unofficial Nordic championship in 1964 and 1966.

Finland also took part in European Championship qualifying since the 1968 event, but had to wait for its first win until 1978.

Later 20th century

The results of the team improved somewhat in the late 1970s and the 1980s. Finland missed out on qualification for Euro 1980 by just a point and for the 1986 World Cup by two points. Finland was invited to take part in the 1980 Summer Olympics in Moscow after many Western countries announced they would boycott the games, but failed to progress from its group.

By the mid-1990s Finland started to have more players in high-profile European leagues, led by the Ajax superstar Jari Litmanen. In 1996 Danish Euro 1992 winning coach Richard Møller Nielsen was hired to take Finland to the 1998 World Cup. The team enjoyed mixed fortunes in the campaign, high points of which were a draw and a win away to Norway and Switzerland respectively. Going into the last match, Finland would have needed a win at home to Hungary to earn a place in the play-offs. They led the game 1–0 going into injury time, but scored an own goal, and once again the dreams of qualification were over. Møller Nielsen also tried to lead Finland to Euro 2000. In this campaign the Finns recorded a sensational win away to Turkey, but couldn't compete with Germany and Turkey in the long run.

Antti Muurinen succeeded Møller Nielsen as coach in 2000. He had arguably the most talented group of Finnish players ever at his disposal, including players such as Antti Niemi, Sami Hyypiä, Teemu Tainio and Mikael Forssell in addition to the legendary Litmanen. The team also performed quite well under him in qualification for the 2002 World Cup despite a difficult draw, earning two draws against Germany and a home draw with England as well as beating Greece 5–1 in Helsinki. In the end, however, England and Germany proved too strong, and the Finns finished third in the group, but were the only team in that group not to lose at home. Hopes were high going into qualification for Euro 2004 after the promising last campaign and friendly wins over the likes of Norway, Belgium and Portugal (which seen the Finns jump from 40th–30th in the Elo ranking). However, Finland started the campaign by losing to Wales and Yugoslavia (later Serbia and Montenegro, now two separate nations). These losses were followed by two defeats by Italy, and a 3–0 home win over Serbia and Montenegro was little consolation, as the Finns finished fourth in the group. In qualification for the 2006 World Cup Finland failed to score a single point in six matches against the top three teams in their group, the Netherlands, the Czech Republic and Romania. Muurinen was sacked in June 2005, and he was replaced by caretaker Jyrki Heliskoski, but results didn't improve.

In August 2005, it was announced that Roy Hodgson would become the new Finland coach in 2006, and he started in the job in January of that year. Hodgson stepped down as manager after they failed to qualify for Euro 2008. His replacement was a Scotsman, Stuart Baxter, who signed a contract until the end of the 2012 European Championship qualification campaign.

Recent history

In the Euro 2008 qualifying Finland needed to win their last qualifying game away at Portugal to qualify for their first major football tournament. However, the match ended 0–0 meaning the team missed out on qualification to the tournament, with Finland ending the group stage with 24 points and Portugal with 27 points. However, the performance in qualifying led to the Finns gaining their best-ever FIFA world ranking to date at the position of 33rd.

The 2010 World Cup qualifying campaign under new head coach Stuart Baxter saw Finland again finish third in their group with five wins, three draws and two defeats. They were the only team in qualifying not to lose to eventual 3rd-place finishers Germany; in both the home and away matches Finland had led Germany only to concede late equalisers. Finland finished a disappointing fourth in Euro 2012 qualifying, with only three wins, two of them against minnows San Marino.

In the 2014 World Cup qualifying campaign, Finland's best result was a 1–1 draw at reigning world champions Spain. They finished third in the five-team Group I, behind Spain and France. Finland finished fourth in Euro 2016 qualifying but achieved another noteworthy result. Joel Pohjanpalo's goal gave the Finns a 1–0 win at former European champions Greece, who had reached the second round of the 2014 World Cup and were the top seeds of their qualifying group.

The 2018 World Cup qualifying campaign saw Finland finish a disappointing fifth in their group with only two wins, although one of them was over Iceland, who finished top of the qualifying group.

On 15 November 2019, Finland managed to qualify to the first major tournament, UEFA Euro 2020, in their history after defeating Liechtenstein 3–0. The successful qualifying campaign in Group J, was aided by a distinctive performance of Teemu Pukki, who scored ten goals in the qualifications.

On 12 June 2021 in the Euro 2020 Finland had their first victory on their debut in a major tournament finals, Joel Pohjanpalo scored the only goal, a header in a 1–0 win over Denmark to grant his country their first goal and win in a major competition. Unfortunately, having lost the next two games from both Russia and Belgium, Finland was eliminated from the group stage alongside fellow debutants North Macedonia as a result of their poor performance after being edged out by fourth placed team Ukraine due to goal difference.

Home stadiums

Most of Finland's important home matches are played at the Helsinki Olympic Stadium in the capital Helsinki. It has been Finland's principal home stadium ever since its construction was completed in 1938. Before that Pallokenttä in Helsinki was mainly used.

Today, some qualifying matches against lower profile opponents and some friendlies are hosted at the Tampere Stadium in Tampere and Veritas Stadion in Turku. Helsinki's Bolt Arena, which has artificial turf, is also used for some friendlies and qualifiers. During the reconstruction of Helsinki Olympic Stadium in 2016–20, Tampere Stadium served as the main stadium for qualifying games.

Kits and crest 

Finland's kit are currently supplied by American brand Nike, Inc. They replaced German company Adidas who supplied Finland's kits between 1979 and 2014.

Kit sponsorship

Results and fixtures

2022

2023

Coaching staff

Coaching history
.

Players

Current squad
The following players were called up for the UEFA Euro 2024 qualifying matches against Denmark on 23 March 2023 and Northern Ireland on 26 March 2023.

Caps and goals as of 12 January 2023, after the match against Estonia.

Recent call-ups
The following players have been called up for the team within the last twelve months and are still available for selection.

Notes
INJ = Withdrew due to an injury
WD = Withdrew due to a non-injury issue
PRE = Preliminary squad / standby
RET = Retired from international duty

Player records

Players in bold are still active with Finland.

Most appearances

Top goalscorers

Competitive record

FIFA World Cup

UEFA European Championship

UEFA Nations League

Olympic Games

Nordic Football Championship

Baltic Cup

Head-to-head record
This list is Finland national team complete records, both friendlies and competitive matches.

Honours
 1912 Summer Olympics
 Fourth place: 1912

Minor tournaments
 Baltic Cup
 Runners-up: 2012
 Third-place: 2014
 Nordic Football Championship
 Winners: 2000–01
 Third-place: 1964–67
 King's Cup
 Runners-up: 2000, 2013
 Fourth place: 1996

See also

Finland men's national under-21 football team
Finland men's national under-19 football team
Finland men's national under-17 football team
Finland women's national football team
Finland women's national under-20 football team
Finland women's national under-17 football team
Football in Finland
Åland official football team
Sápmi football team

References

External links

Official website 
RSSSF archive of results 1911–
RSSSF archive of most capped players and highest goalscorers
RSSSF archive of coaches
The Finnish National Team Supporters' Association
Reports for all official matches
Russian fan site about Finnish football and national team (in Russian)

 
European national association football teams